Elaeagnus multiflora, the cherry elaeagnus, cherry silverberry, goumi, gumi, or natsugumi, is a species of Elaeagnus native to China, Korea, and Japan.

The shoots are densely covered in minute red-brown scales.

When ripe in mid- to late summer, the fruit is juicy and edible, with a sweet but astringent taste somewhat similar to that of rhubarb. The skin of the fruit is thin and fragile, making it difficult to transport, thus reducing its viability as a food crop.

As with other species in the genus Elaeagnus, E. multiflora plants are actinorhizal, growing in symbiosis with the bacterium Frankia in the soil. These bacteria fix atmospheric nitrogen, making it available in usable form for the host plant, and indirectly for other nearby plants. This feature allows the plant to grow in poorer soils than it could otherwise.

This species is occasionally grown in Europe and North America as an ornamental plant and for its fruit. It is an established exotic species in parts of the eastern United States.

References

Japan Tree Encyclopaedia: Natsugumi (Elaeagnus multiflora)
Plants for a Future: Elaeagnus multiflora

Edible fruits
multiflora
Plants described in 1784